La Blanqueada is a barrio (neighbourhood or district) of Montevideo, Uruguay.

Location
It borders Tres Cruces to the west, Larrañaga to the northwest, Unión to the northeast and Parque Batlle to the south. It is home to the Military Hospital.

Several main avenues border and cross this barrio: 8 de Octubre Avenue, Italia Avenue, Dr. Luis Alberto de Herrera Avenue and Centenario Avenue.

According to the historian Orestes Araújo, the name of this neighbourhood (derived from blanco, Spanish for "white") was given by an old grocery store all in white.

Places of worship
 Parish Church of Our Lady of the Assumption, known also as the Italian Catholic Mission (Roman Catholic, Scalabrinians)

See also 
Barrios of Montevideo

References

External links 
 Revista Raices / Historia del barrio La Blanqueada 

 
Barrios of Montevideo